Cat Protection Society of Victoria (CPS) is an organisation in the state of Victoria, Australia, that describes itself as "Australia’s largest cat welfare organisation." It provides cat management and pound/shelter operation for a number of Melbourne councils. It is funded in part by these pound contracts but also receives private donations and is a tax deductible gift recipient.

CPS was instrumental in founding the "Cat Crisis Coalition" to lobby government at all levels for mandatory desexing in an effort to reduce the numbers of healthy cats and kittens whose lives are ended in shelters. It has also been instrumental in the Victorian government's "Who's for Cats" campaign which aims to discourage people from feeding cats they do not own.

History 
CPS was established in 1947 and has since been responsible for several campaigns intended to educate the public about responsible cat ownership and interactions.

The organization plans to build a new shelter in 2015, including full vet services, all in a state-of-the-art facility.

Performance
In 2009, CPS reported the following outcomes for admitted cats
 8881 Euthanised on entry - wild, unweaned, humane
 2467 Euthanised due to disease, no home available
 132 Reclaimed
 1011 Adoptions

These rates do not reflect the current successes of The Cat Protection Society. As of 2013, euthanasia rates were greatly reduced, and staff members have strived to rehabilitate as many cats as possible for rehoming.

Position

Mandatory desexing
Higher euthanasia rates have been blamed on the cats' remarkable reproductive capability, asserting that an intact female can be responsible for 1,048,756 offspring in one year. CPS advocates for mandatory desexing laws aimed at reducing the number of cats born. The organization's executive director Dr Carole Webb was instrumental in forming the 'Cat Crisis Coalition' which lobbies for mandatory desexing in Victoria.

Who's For Cats Campaign
The organization was involved with a coalition of animal welfare organizations in creating and furthering the Victorian government's "Who's for Cats" campaign. The campaign aims to discourage people from feeding cats they don't own unless they take responsibility for them and get them desexed. Otherwise people are encouraged to call their council to have the cats removed and possibly euthanised. An extensive media campaign began in November 2007 and grew to become a national campaign throughout Australia.

An evaluation of the program in 2009 stated that all stakeholders considered the cooperative campaign approach was effective. Other issues hoped to be addressed included mandatory registration (achieved 1 November 2012 for Western Australia), containment of cats to the owner's property (now the law in Victoria), impact of climate change on the cat breeding season, and promoting the benefits of responsible cat ownership.

See also 
 Animal welfare and rights in Australia

References

External links
 Official website

Animal charities based in Australia
Domestic cat welfare organizations
Non-profit organisations based in Victoria (Australia)